L'Isle-sur-la-Sorgue (or  ) is a town and commune on the Sorgue river in Southeastern France. Politically, the commune is in the arrondissement of Avignon within the department of Vaucluse, in the région of Provence-Alpes-Côte d'Azur.

The small town is famous for its many antique shops and hosts antique markets most Sundays. It has many waterside cafés and restaurants, all within walking distance of each other. Its many attractive water wheels throughout the town are still in working order.

L'Isle-sur-la-Sorgue had a population of 20,042 as of 2019. It is twinned with the towns of Penicuik in Scotland and Anagni in Italy.

History

Originally known as "Insula", the town officially adopted the name of "L'Isle-sur-la-Sorgue" on 18 August 1890, taking the latter part of its name from the river Sorgue, to which it owed much. As early as the 12th century, the river served defensively as a moat around ramparts which surrounded the town until 1795. The river also served as a source of food and industry: fishing and artisan mills for oil, wheat, silk, paper, woolenry, rugs and dyeing. A busy commerce developed until there were two annual fairs and two weekly markets. The current Sunday open-air market originated on 9 November 1596.

Population

Twins cities
 Penicuik, Scotland
 Anagni, Italy

Places to see
Jewish cemetery of L'Isle-sur-la-Sorgue

See also
Communes of the Vaucluse department

References

External links
Official web site of the town (site not available as of 16 April 2015)
L’isle-sur-la-Sorgues, Capitale de l'antiquité et de la brocante, (in French) Capital of antique shops and flea markets.

Communes of Vaucluse